Alan Geoffrey Woods (born 18 July 1942) is a retired Anglican priest.

Woods was educated at Bristol Cathedral Choir School. After qualifying as an accountant he worked for the Goodyear Tyre and Rubber Company until 1967. Following study at Salisbury Theological College he was ordained in 1970. He was a curate at St Francis Church Ashton Gate and then the youth chaplain for the Archdeaconry of Swindon and the warden of Legge House Residential Youth Centre until 1976. After this he was priest in charge of Neston and then Team Vicar of Greater Corsham, during which time he also became a chaplain to the Territororial Army. In 1983 he became the vicar of Charminster and Stinsford and in 1985 the Rural Dean of Dorchester.In 1990 he became Vicar of Calne and Blackland, Rural Dean of Calne and Chaplain to St Mary's School, Calne.In 1992 he was made an honorary canon of Salisbury Cathedral. From 1996 he was the Anglican chaplain of Malta and Gozo and Chancellor of St Paul's Cathedral, Valletta. He was the Dean of Gibraltar from 2003 to 2008, a post he combined with those of Vicar General to the Bishop in Europe and Archdeacon of Gibraltar from 2005. Since retirement to Dorchester he continues to be a locum in the Diocese in Europe as well as helping in his own parish and is also the Clergy Retirement Officer for Dorset in the Diocese of Salisbury.

References

1942 births
People educated at Bristol Cathedral Choir School
Deans of Gibraltar
Archdeacons of Swindon
Archdeacons of Gibraltar
Fellows of the Association of Chartered Certified Accountants
Living people
Royal Army Chaplains' Department officers